Shahrabad District is a district (bakhsh) in Bardaskan County, Razavi Khorasan Province, Iran. At the 2006 census, its population was 17,719, in 4,518 families. The district has one city: Shahrabad. The district has two rural districts (dehestan): Jolgeh Rural District and Shahrabad Rural District.

References 

Districts of Razavi Khorasan Province
Bardaskan County